In enzymology, a (2,3-dihydroxybenzoyl)adenylate synthase is an enzyme that catalyzes the chemical reaction ATP + 2,3-dihydroxybenzoate  diphosphate + (2,3-dihydroxybenzoyl)adenylate.

Thus, the two substrates of this enzyme are ATP and 2,3-dihydroxybenzoate, whereas its two products are diphosphate and (2,3-dihydroxybenzoyl)adenylate.

This enzyme belongs to the family of transferases, specifically those transferring phosphorus-containing nucleotide groups (nucleotidyltransferases).  The systematic name of this enzyme class is ATP:2,3-dihydroxybenzoate adenylyltransferase. This enzyme is also called 2,3-dihydroxybenzoate-AMP ligase.  This enzyme participates in biosynthesis of siderophore group nonribosomal.

References 

EC 2.7.7
Enzymes of unknown structure